Manuela Schär (born 5 December 1984) is a Paralympian athlete from Switzerland competing mainly in category T54 sprint events. She has used a wheelchair since the age of 8, when a playground accident paralysed her from the waist down.

Career
Schär competed in the 2004 Summer Paralympics in Athens, Greece.  There she won a silver medal in the women's 200 metres – T54 event, bronze in the women's 100 metres – T54 event and finished sixth in the women's 400 metres – T54 event. At the 2008 Summer Paralympics in Beijing, China, she won bronze in the women's 200 metres – T54 event, finishing fourth in the 100 metres and sixth again in the women's 400 metres. She competed again in the 2012 Summer Paralympics in London, where her best results were two fifth places.

In 2017, she won the Women's Wheelchair category of the 121st Boston Marathon and the 37th London Marathon. In 2018, she won the Women's Wheelchair category of the 2018 Chicago Marathon and the 2018 TCS New York City Marathon. In 2019, she won the 123rd Boston Marathon and the 2019 TCS New York City Marathon.

In 2021, she won the women's wheelchair race at  the 2021 Berlin Marathon, the 2021 London Marathon and the 2021 Boston Marathon.

In 2022, she won the women's wheelchair race at the 2022 Boston Marathon.

References 

 
 Manuela Schär's home page (in German)

Paralympic athletes of Switzerland
Athletes (track and field) at the 2004 Summer Paralympics
Athletes (track and field) at the 2008 Summer Paralympics
Athletes (track and field) at the 2012 Summer Paralympics
Athletes (track and field) at the 2016 Summer Paralympics
Athletes (track and field) at the 2020 Summer Paralympics
Paralympic gold medalists for Switzerland
Paralympic silver medalists for Switzerland
Paralympic bronze medalists for Switzerland
People with paraplegia
Swiss female sprinters
Living people
1984 births
Medalists at the 2004 Summer Paralympics
Medalists at the 2008 Summer Paralympics
Medalists at the 2020 Summer Paralympics
Boston Marathon female winners
London Marathon female winners
New York City Marathon female winners
Paralympic medalists in athletics (track and field)
Berlin Marathon female winners
20th-century Swiss women
21st-century Swiss women